Anavra is a village and a former community in Magnesia, Thessaly, Greece. Since the 2011 local government reform, it has been part of the municipality Almyros, of which it is a municipal unit. The municipal unit has an area of 121.859 km2. According to the census of 2011, the population of Anavra was 584 citizens. The Enipeas river, which is a tributary of the Pineios, starts at the springs of Anavra and passes through the village for two kilometres.

According to mythology, Anavra is connected with livestock activities. Almost all the inhabitants are employed in farming and herding.

Economy

In the 1970s mules were the only form of transport available in Anavra, and the nearest school, in Lamia, was a 6-hour ride away. Since the 1990s the village has been transformed by mayor Dimitris Tsoukalas, who successfully sought EU development funding.

In 2010, Anavra had among the highest GDP per capita of any settlement in Greece and the rest of the EU with typical incomes ranging from 30,000 to 100,000 euros, with an average household income of €70,000. The village was recognized as a model of sustainable development, producing its own electricity by 20 wind-powered generators. Surplus electrical power was sold.  A hydroelectric plant was scheduled for construction, and a biomass facility was being planned which will supply heat and hot water from animal manure and woodchips. The plan called for all homes and buildings in the town to be connected to this heat/hot water network. All these projects were stalled and eventually cancelled with the inclusion of the village in the greater Almyros municipality, due to the "Kallikratis" reform. The overhead produced by the "kapodistrias" community era is gradually being diminished.

Plans are being proposed for the creation of a winter ski centre on the slopes of Mount Othrys and its highest peak, Gerakovouni (1726 m), west of the village.

Sites of Interest
 Saint Dimitrios church
 The Folklore Museum of Farming Life.
 The waterfalls of Enipeas
 Othry mountain and its rich flora

General information

Community office, Tel: 22320 91382
Communal Library, Tel: 22320 91210
Folklore Museum of Farming Life, Tel: 22320 91210

See also
List of towns and villages of Greece

References

Further reading

 Καραλή, Μ. (επιμ.) (1994) Πρακτικά Συνεδρίου "Το παρελθόν, το παρόν και το μέλλον της Ανάβρας (Γούρας)", 31 Ιουλίου – 1 Αυγούστου 1993, Αθήνα: Κοινότητα Ανάβρας Μαγνησίας.
 Καραλή, Μ.  (2002) "Κοινότητα Ανάβρας Αλμυρού Μαγνησίας. Ένα πείραμα τοπικής ανάπτυξης με πρωτοβουλία της Τοπικής Αυτοδιοίκησης", Γεωγραφίες, 4, σσ. 123-129.
 Μηλιώνης, π. Α. (2006) Η Ανάβρα (Γούρα) της Όθρυος, Ανάβρα Αλμυρού Μαγνησίας: Κοινότητα Ανάβρας Αλμυρού Μαγνησίας.
 Περιοδικό "Κ" της Καθημερινής (2009) "Αφιέρωμα στην Ανάβρα", 12/03.

External links
Official Website (in Greek and English)
Official Website of the Environmental and Cultural Park of Anavra "Goura" (in Greek and English)
Anavra-Zo (in Greek)

Populated places in Magnesia (regional unit)